Justicia burchellii is an ornamental plant native of Cerrado vegetation of Brazil.

See also
 List of plants of Cerrado vegetation of Brazil

External links
 Justicia burchellii

burchellii
Justicia burchellii
Justicia burchellii